The 1987–88 Kent Football League season was the 22nd in the history of the Kent Football League, a football competition in England.

The league was won by Greenwich Borough for the second time in a row but was not promoted to the Southern Football League.

League table

The league featured 18 clubs which competed in the previous season, along with one new club:
Danson, transferred from the London Spartan League

League table

References

External links

1987-88
1987–88 in English football leagues